Zahed Mahmud (also Romanized as Zāhed Maḩmūd; also known as Zād Maḩmūd) is a village in Howmeh Rural District, in the Central District of Larestan County, Fars Province, Iran. At the 2006 census, its population was 316, in 61 families.

References 

Populated places in Larestan County